Compostela Aberta is a grassroots movement and political coalition in the city of Santiago de Compostela that runs a left-wing "popular unity" candidacy to the municipal elections of May 2015.

Martiño Noriega, a member of Anova-Nationalist Brotherhood (Anova) was elected as the candidate. The candidacy is supported by EU, Anova-Nationalist Brotherhood, Equo, Podemos, Espazo Ecosocialista Galego and independents. It's one of the many "popular unity" candidacies formed by left-wing political parties in Galicia and Spain to the Spanish local elections, 2015; like Marea Atlántica, Ahora Madrid, Barcelona en Comú, Marea de Vigo or Málaga Ahora.

History
The members of the candidacy were elected, in addition to mayor Martiño Noriega, were María Rozas (financial management consultant and member of United Left), Jorge Duarte (architect, former president of the College of Architects of Galicia), Branca Novoneyra (writer and choreographer), Xan Duro (Verdegaia ecologist activist, member of the Espazo Ecosocialista Galego), Concha Fernández (former local leader of the Galician Nationalist Bloc, teacher of Community Social Intervention and former union activist), Manuel Dios Diz (president of the Galician Seminar of Education for Peace and also a member of the Espazo Ecosocialista Galego), Marta Lois (professor of Political Science), Rafa Peña Vidal (CIG unionist at the Lavacolla Airport and member of the Galician People's Front) and Noa Morales (expert in international relations and a member of United Left).

On June 13, Martiño Noriega was elected mayor of Santiago de Compostela. The "concellerías" (Local departments) were distributed the following way:
 Martiño Noriega Sánchez. Mayor. Spokesperson of the Local Government Council. Direct competences in Internal Regime (Personnel Recruitment, Archive, Innovation and Information Technology), Galician language, Participation and Neighborhood relationships.
 María Rozas Pérez. Councilor responsible for the Economy and Finance Department, with competences in Economic and Financial Planning, Tax Management, Budget Management and Fiscal Policy. First Deputy Mayor.
 Jorge Duarte Vázquez. Councillor responsible of Citizens Spaces, Right to Housing and Mobility, with competences in historic city, Rehabilitation, Urban planning, Urban development, Housing and Right to Mobility. Second Deputy Mayor.
 Branca Novoneyra. Councillor responsible for the Culture Department, with competences in Auditorio de Galicia, Teatro Principal, Network of socio-cultural centers and Popular festivities. Third Deputy Mayor.
 Xan Duro Fernández. Councillor responsible of the Environment and Coexistence Department, with competences in Sustainability (MSW, Water, Energy and Consumer Affairs), Public parks and Coexistence (Local Police, Fire and Civil Protection). Secretary of the Governing Board.
 Concepción Fernández Fernández. Councillor responsible for the Diversity and Social Department, with competences in Social policies, Diversity, Public health, Social economy, UMAD, UAMI and cooperation.
 Manuel Dios Diz. Councillor responsible for the Education and citizenship Department, with competences in Education, Citizenship and Human rights. Member of the Provincial deputation.
 Marta Lois González. Councillor responsible for the Equality, Economic Development and Tourism Department, with competences in Equality, Economic Promotion, Employment, Markets, Local business and Tourism.
 Rafael Peña Vidal. Councillor responsible for the Rural Areas and Territorial Balance Department, with competences in Rural Areas and the Brigade of Public Works.
 Noa Morales Sánchez. Councillor responsible for the Youth, Sport and Animal Welfare Department, with competences in Youth, Sport and Animal shelter.

Electoral results

See also
 Marea Atlántica
 Marea de Pontevedra
 Marea de Vigo

References

External links
 Official website (gl)
 Official Twitter (gl)

Podemos (Spanish political party)
Political party alliances in Spain
Political parties established in 2015
Political parties in Galicia (Spain)
2015 establishments in Galicia (Spain)
United Left (Spain)